Novokhutornoye is a rural locality (a selo) and the administrative center of Novokhutornoye Rural Settlement, Krasnogvardeysky District, Belgorod Oblast, Russia. The population was 487 as of 2010. There are 3 streets.

Geography 
Novokhutornoye is located 21 km southwest of Biryuch (the district's administrative centre) by road. Gorovoye is the nearest rural locality.

References 

Rural localities in Krasnogvardeysky District, Belgorod Oblast